The Tamron SP 150-600mm F/5-6.3 Di VC USD is a super telezoom lens for DSLR cameras, announced by Tamron on November 7, 2013. The Sony A mount version is called Tamron SP 150-600mm F/5-6.3 Di USD as it lacks image stabilisation (VC, or Vibration Compensation, in Tamron classification).

A 2nd generation of this lens, called "G2", was released on Sept 23, 2016.  Improvements include more effective image stabilization (to a claimed 4.5 stops of benefit), faster AF speed and compatibility with Tamron's 'TAP-in' Console, for lens firmware updates and customization. A 'Flex Zoom Lock' mechanism has also been added to keep the lens barrel fixed at any focal length. Fluorine coating has been added to the front lens element, and the entire lens barrel offers greater moisture resistance.  The G2 is also fully weather sealed.

References
 http://www.dpreview.com/products/tamron/lenses/tamron_150-600_5-6p3_vc/specifications
 http://www.steves-digicams.com/camera-reviews/tamron/sp-150-600mm-f5-63-di-vc-usd/tamron-sp-150-600mm-f5-63-di-vc-usd-lens-review.html

External links

 http://photo.net/reviews/tamron-150-600/ photo.net
 http://www.popphoto.com/gear/2014/06/lens-test-tamron-150-600mm-f5-63-di-vc-usd PopularPhotography
 https://photographylife.com/my-one-night-stand-with-the-tamron-150-600mm photographylife
 https://luminous-landscape.com/sony-a7ii-tamron-150-600mm-antarctica/ Luminous Landscape
 http://www.dpreview.com/articles/8712824369/tamron-sp-150-600mm-f-5-0-6-3-di-vc-usd-field-test DPReview

150-600
Camera lenses introduced in 2013